Rawcliffe railway station is a railway station that serves the village of Rawcliffe in the East Riding of Yorkshire, England. The station is located on the Pontefract Line.

The line passing through here was once a busy passenger and freight link to the inland port of Goole (the line and station first being opened by the Lancashire and Yorkshire Railway in 1848) but since the mid-1980s much of the traffic that once used this route has disappeared. The station has also been downsized and its signal box demolished.

Facilities
The station is unstaffed with only part of the one remaining platform in use (though the defunct station building still stands and is used as a private residence).  A single waiting shelter, timetable poster board and public telephone are the only facilities provided.  Tickets can only be purchased in advance or on the train, as there is no ticketing provision. Step-free access is available between the car park and platform.

Services
Rawcliffe is served by a limited service of 3 trains per day Monday-Saturday only. The station is not served on Sundays.

References

External links

Railway stations in the East Riding of Yorkshire
DfT Category F2 stations
Former Lancashire and Yorkshire Railway stations
Northern franchise railway stations
Railway stations in Great Britain opened in 1848
Low usage railway stations in the United Kingdom